Ülo Õun (30 April 1940 – 7 March 1988) was an Estonian sculptor whose career began in the late 1960s and came to prominence in the 1970s. Õun mainly worked as a portrait and figural sculptor and was known for his works in colored plaster and bronze.

Early life and education
Ülo Õun was born and raised in Tartu, one of two children of Ado and Alma Õun (née Lellep). He graduated from Tartu Secondary School No. 2 (now, the Miina Härma Gymnasium) in 1958. Afterward, he studied mathematics at Tartu State University (now, the University of Tartu) for a year, before enrolling at the State Art Institute of the Estonian SSR (now, the Estonian Academy of Arts) to study visual arts, with an emphasis on sculpting. He graduated from the institution in 1966.

Career
After graduating, Õun worked as a taxidermist at the Estonian Museum of Natural History. His first exhibition was held at the Tallinn Art Hall gallery, with artists Ellen Koll and Aili Vint in 1970.

In 1971, he became a freelance artist and began sculpting, mainly portraits and figural sculptures. He rose to national prominence in the 1970s, with a style that art critics have described as "friendly grotesque"; Õun's sculptures could not easily be associated with any art movement known in Estonia at that time or compared with any "significant work". He distinguished himself from the generation of Estonian sculptural innovators of the 1960s by his characteristic deformation of form. Õun was fascinated by color, fluidity, and the variability of forms in his work and addressed the subjective spiritual nature of man. His early exhibitions aroused passionate support and admiration from the public and critics, but was not without detractors.

One of Õun's most notable sculptures is Isa ja poeg (English: Father and Son), created in plaster in 1977. The sculpture depicts Õun and his 18-month-old son Kristjan nude, holding hands and standing at the same height. The work symbolizes the relationship between different generations, and the ephemeral period of childhood. The sculpture caused a furor when it was initially exhibited at the Tallinn Art Hall in 1977. In 1987, it was cast in bronze and originally installed in Tallinn. In the autumn of 2001, the Tartu City Government bought the sculpture and intended to install it on the slope of Toomemägi next to the Inglisild (Angel's Bridge). A granite base for the sculpture was made, but an ordinance was brought to light that only artwork and monuments related to the University of Tartu could be installed on Toomemägi. The sculpture was later unveiled for permanent display on Küüni Street on Child Protection Day, 1 June 2004, in Tartu's Central Park, facing Town Hall Square. Isa ja poeg has become a well-known landmark of Tartu.

In 1978, Õun created portrait sculptures of Estonian cultural figures: painter Tiit Pääsuke, artist Kaljo Põllu, and actor and theater pedagogue Voldemar Panso, for which he won the Kristjan Raud Art Prize the following year. Other portrait sculptures by Õun include those of composers Gustav Ernesaks and Veljo Tormis, author Eduard Vilde, actor and poet Juhan Viiding, actress Elle Kull, zoologist Harald Haberman, artists Jüri Palm and Villu Jõgeva, and actors and theater pedagogues Kaarel Ird, Theodor Altermann, Paul Pinna, and Mikk Mikiver. His monument to Baltic German physiologist and professor Alexander Schmidt was opened in Kassitoome park on the grounds of the University of Tartu in 1982.

Ülo Õun's artistic output was prolific during his twenty-year career. He held numerous solo and shared exhibitions, and his world can be found in several institutions and public installations throughout the country, including the Tartu Art Museum and the Art Museum of Estonia.

Personal life and death
Ülo Õun married Latvian leather artist Ināra Õun (née Zvaigzne; 1941–2012) in 1967. The couple had three children: two daughters and a son, Kristjan. Õun died in 1988, aged 47 and was interred in Tallinn's Forest Cemetery.

Legacy

Several documentaries were made profiling Ülo Õun during his lifetime, the first significant one being the 1984 Arvo Iho directed , for Tallinnfilm. In 1986, he was profiled in the Aime Kala directed documentary short  for Eesti Rahvusringhääling.

In 2009, an exhibition of a selection of Õun's work curated by Juta Kivimäe titled  (English: Ülo Õun. Artist  on a Broken Trail of Discovery)  was held at the Kumu museum in Tallinn. The exhibition was awarded the Best Exhibition of the Year by the Ministry of Culture of Estonia.

References

1940 births
1988 deaths
People from Tartu
Soviet sculptors
Taxidermists
20th-century Estonian sculptors
20th-century Estonian male artists
Miina Härma Gymnasium alumni
University of Tartu alumni
Estonian Academy of Arts alumni
Burials at Metsakalmistu